Tibor Lendvai (born 1 February 1940) is a former Hungarian cyclist. He competed in the 1000m time trial and the men's tandem events at the 1968 Summer Olympics.

References

1940 births
Living people
Hungarian male cyclists
Olympic cyclists of Hungary
Cyclists at the 1968 Summer Olympics
Cyclists from Budapest